{{DISPLAYTITLE:C20H18O5}}
The molecular formula C20H18O5 (molar mass : 338.35 g/mol, exact mass : 338.115424 u) may refer to:

 Desmethoxycurcumin, a curcuminoid 
 Glyceollin I, a pterocarpan found in soybeans
 Glyceollin III, a pterocarpan found in soybeans
 Wighteone, an isoflavone found in Maclura aurantiaca